The 2022 Lucas Oil 150 was the 23rd and final stock car race of the 2022 NASCAR Camping World Truck Series season, the Championship 4 race, and the 24th iteration of the event. The race was held on Friday, November 4, 2022, in Avondale, Arizona at Phoenix Raceway, a  permanent tri-oval shaped racetrack. The race was increased from 150 laps to 154 laps, due to a NASCAR overtime finish. Zane Smith, driving for Front Row Motorsports, would put on a dominating performance, leading 77 laps to earn his seventh career NASCAR Camping World Truck Series win, and his fourth of the season. 

By winning the race, Smith would also claim the 2022 NASCAR Camping World Truck Series championship, finishing just in front of Ben Rhodes and Chandler Smith in a 1-2-3 finish. This was Zane's first championship in the Truck Series, after finishing runner-up in the standings from 2020 to 2021. This was also the first championship for Front Row Motorsports as an organization.

Background 
Phoenix Raceway is a 1-mile, low-banked tri-oval race track located in Avondale, Arizona, near Phoenix. The motorsport track opened in 1964 and currently hosts two NASCAR race weekends annually including the final championship race since 2020. Phoenix Raceway has also hosted the CART, IndyCar Series, USAC and the WeatherTech SportsCar Championship. The raceway is currently owned and operated by NASCAR.

Phoenix Raceway is home to two annual NASCAR race weekends, one of 13 facilities on the NASCAR schedule to host more than one race weekend a year. It first joined the NASCAR Cup Series schedule in 1988 as a late season event, and in 2005 the track was given a spring date. The now-NASCAR Camping World Truck Series was added in 1995 and the now-NASCAR Xfinity Series began running there in 1999.

NASCAR announced that its championship weekend events would be run at Phoenix for 2020, marking the first time since NASCAR inaugurated the weekend that Homestead-Miami Speedway would not be the host track. The track will also hold the championship for the 2021 NASCAR Cup season.

Championship drivers 

 Ty Majeski advanced by winning at Bristol and Homestead-Miami.
 Zane Smith advanced by virtue of points.
 Ben Rhodes advanced by virtue of points.
 Chandler Smith advanced by virtue of points.

Entry list 

 (R) denotes rookie driver.

Practice 
The only 50-minute practice session was held on Thursday, November 3, at 5:05 PM MST.

Qualifying 
Qualifying was held on Friday, November 4, at 3:00 PM MST. Since Phoenix Raceway is a tri-oval track, the qualifying system used is a single-car, one-lap system with only one round. Whoever sets the fastest time in the round wins the pole.

Race results 
Stage 1 Laps: 44

Stage 2 Laps: 44

Stage 3 Laps: 64*

Standings after the race 

Drivers' Championship standings

Note: Only the first 10 positions are included for the driver standings.

References 

2022 NASCAR Camping World Truck Series
NASCAR races at Phoenix Raceway
Lucas Oil 150
Lucas Oil 150